Cavite's at-large congressional district refers to the lone congressional district of the Philippines in the province of Cavite for various national legislatures before 1987. The province elected its representatives province-wide at-large from its reorganization under Article 6 of the Decreto de 18 junio de 1898 y las instrucciones sobre el régimen de las provincias y pueblos for the Malolos Congress in 1898 until the creation of a first, second and third district on February 2, 1987. It was a single-member district throughout the ten legislatures of the Insular Government of the Philippine Islands from 1907 to 1935, the three legislatures of the Philippine Commonwealth from 1935 to 1946, and the first seven congresses of the republic from 1946 to 1972.

On three occasions in its history, Cavite sent more than one member to the national legislatures who were also elected at-large. Four representatives were elected to the National Assembly (Malolos Congress) of the First Philippine Republic from 1898 to 1901, two representatives to the National Assembly of the Second Philippine Republic from 1943 to 1944 (excluding Cavite City, which was represented separately), and three representatives to the Regular Batasang Pambansa of the Fourth Philippine Republic from 1984 to 1986.

After 1986, all representatives were elected from congressional districts.

Representation history

See also
Legislative districts of Cavite

References

Former congressional districts of the Philippines
Politics of Cavite
1898 establishments in the Philippines
1986 disestablishments in the Philippines
At-large congressional districts of the Philippines
Congressional districts of Calabarzon
Constituencies established in 1898
Constituencies established in 1986